The 1991 Baltimore mayoral election saw the reelection of incumbent mayor Kurt Schmoke.

Nominations
Primary elections were held September 12.

Democratic primary

Republican primary

General election
The general election was held November 15.

References

Baltimore mayoral
Mayoral elections in Baltimore
Baltimore